{{Infobox Christian leader
| type             = cardinal
| honorific-prefix = His Eminence
| name             = Gérald Lacroix
| honorific-suffix = ISPX
| native_name      = 
| title            = Cardinal, Archbishop of QuebecPrimate of Canada
| image            = Mouvaux - Cardinal Gérald Cyprien Lacroix - 1 (cropped).jpg
| image_size       = 
| alt              = 
| caption          = 
| church           = Catholic Church
| archdiocese      = Quebec
| province         = 
| metropolis       = 
| diocese          = 
| see              = 
| elected          = 
| appointed        = 22 February 2011
| term             = 
| term_start       = 25 March 2011
| quashed          = 
| term_end         = 
| predecessor      = Marc Ouellet
| opposed          = 
| successor        = 
| other_post       = Cardinal Priest of San Giuseppe all'Aurelio 

| ordination       = 8 October 1988
| ordained_by      = Maurice Couture
| consecration     = 24 May 2009
| consecrated_by   = Marc Ouellet
| cardinal         = 22 February 2014
| created_cardinal_by = Pope Francis
| rank             = Cardinal-Priest

| birth_name       = 
| birth_date       = 
| birth_place      = Saint-Hilaire-de-Dorset, Quebec, Canada
| death_date       = 
| death_place      = 
| buried           = 
| religion         = Roman Catholic
| residence        = 
| parents          = Brigitte Laurendeau & Raymond Lacroix
| spouse           = 
| children         = 
| occupation       = 
| profession       = 
| previous_post    = Auxiliary Bishop of Quebec (2009–2011)Titular Bishop of Hilta (2009–2011)
| alma_mater       = 
| motto            = "Mane nobiscum Domine"("Stay with us, Lord")
| signature        = 
| signature_alt    = 

| feast_day        = 
| venerated        = 
| saint_title      = 
| beatified_date   = 
| beatified_place  = 
| beatified_by     = 
| canonized_date   = 
| canonized_place  = 
| canonized_by     = 
| attributes       = 
| patronage        = 
| shrine           = 
| suppressed_date  = 

| other            = 
}} 

Gérald Cyprien Lacroix  (born July 27, 1957) is the Archbishop of Quebec and Primate of Canada since his appointment by Pope Benedict XVI on 22 February 2011. He has been a cardinal since 22 February 2014. He was previously Auxiliary Bishop of Quebec.

Early life
Lacroix was born on 27 July 1957 in Saint-Hilaire-de-Dorset in the Archdiocese of Quebec and completed his secondary and higher education at Trinity High School in Manchester, New Hampshire, and Saint Anselm College in the neighbouring town of Goffstown. He then studied for his theological training at Université Laval, obtaining a Bachelor of Arts degree in theology. He continued with a master's degree in pastoral theology. In 1975 he was accepted at the Pius X Secular Institute and took perpetual vows in 1982.

Priesthood
In 1982 Lacroix became Secretary General of the institute, and since 1985 has been Director of the General Council. From 1985 to 1987 he was appointed general manager of the institute's Christian formation and spiritual centre. He was ordained priest on 8 October 1988 by Archbishop Maurice Couture in the Parish of Notre-Dame-de-la-Récouvrance.

From 1990 to 2000 Lacroix worked in Colombia, where he opened new houses of the institute. From 2001 to 2004 he was Director General of the institute, and re-elected for five years from 2005 to 2010.

Episcopacy
Lacroix was appointed Titular Bishop of Ilta and Auxiliary Bishop of Quebec on 7 April 2009 and received episcopal consecration on 24 May with Marc Ouellet as principal consecrator, the principal co-consecrators being Maurice Couture and Gilles Lemay.

On 22 February 2011 Lacroix was appointed Archbishop of Quebec and Primate of Canada, replacing Marc Ouellet, who had been appointed Prefect of the Congregation for Bishops on 30 June 2010. During the sede vacante'' after the death of Pope John Paul II, Lacroix was elected diocesan administrator by the College of Consultors. He is currently one of the co-chairmen of the Committee on Life and Family of the Canadian Conference of Catholic Bishops. After his appointment, Lacroix said that he would continue the work of Ouellet and re-evangelize the province. Lacroix noted that he favours a discussion-based approach. "I'm going to be different. One thing is certain: I will preach the Gospel. If people expect something else, they'll be disappointed", he said.

Lacroix received an honorary doctorate in divinity from Saint Anselm College at the college's 118th commencement exercises held on 21 May 2011. He was also the commencement speaker.

Lacroix received the pallium from Pope Benedict on 29 June 2011, the Feast of Saints Peter and Paul in Rome along with all other metropolitan archbishops appointed since 2010. He was elevated to the College of Cardinals by Pope Francis at the consistory on 22 February 2014.

In October 2016 Lacroix was appointed a member of the Congregation for Divine Worship and the Discipline of the Sacraments in addition to his other duties.

On 7 March 2023, Lacroix was appointed to the Council of Cardinal Advisors.

See also
Cardinals created by Francis

References

External links
 
Gerald Lacroix
 Vaillancourt, Philippe. "Roommates: Quebec cardinal, Anglican bishop shared same roof for a year", Catholic News Service, April 8, 2018

1957 births
21st-century Roman Catholic archbishops in Canada
Roman Catholic archbishops of Quebec
Canadian cardinals
Cardinals created by Pope Francis
French Quebecers
Living people
Members of the Congregation for Divine Worship and the Discipline of the Sacraments
Members of the Congregation for Institutes of Consecrated Life and Societies of Apostolic Life
Members of the Pontifical Council for Culture
Members of the Pontifical Council for Interreligious Dialogue
People from Chaudière-Appalaches
Saint Anselm College alumni
Université Laval alumni
Canadian Roman Catholic archbishops